Almighty So is a mixtape by American hip hop recording artist Chief Keef. The mixtape was hosted by DJ Scream and was self-released on October 12, 2013. It features production from a variety of producers, including ISOBeats and OhZone. The album was poorly received upon release, but has since gone on to become a fan favorite, and an influence on future trap artists.

Track listing

References

Chief Keef albums
Self-released albums
2013 mixtape albums